HSwMS Gävle was a destroyer of the Royal Swedish Navy that served during the Second World War and in the Cold War. The destroyer served in the Coastal Fleet during the war, protecting Swedish neutrality and assisting in the 1944 evacuation of Estonia. After the conflict had ceased, the ship was upgraded with enhanced fire control and an armament improved with the introduction of the Bofors 40 mm anti-aircraft gun between 1950 and 1951. Ten years later, in 1961, Gävle was rearmed as a fast anti-submarine frigate and the torpedo tubes were replaced by Squid mortars. After being decommissioned on 6 December 1968, the vessel helped in the testing of the equipment for the Oskarshamn Nuclear Power Plant, finally being broken up in 1972.

Design and development

Gävle was the first of this final batch to be ordered.

Power was provided by three Penhoët oil-fired boilers feeding two de Laval geared steam turbines driving two shafts. The ship had two funnels. In trials, the destroyer exceeded .

The main armament consisted of three  K/45 M24C dual-purpose guns produced by Bofors. These were placed in separate mounts on the ship's centreline, with one on the forecastle, one aft and one between the funnels. Air defence consisted six  M/40 autocannons in three twin mounts, also provided by Bofors.Two triple rotating torpedo tube mounts for  torpedoes were aft of the superstructure and two depth charge throwers were carried further towards the stern. Approximately forty mines could also be carried for minelaying. The ship had a complement of 135 officers and ratings.

Construction and career
Gävle was laid down by Götaverken in Gothenburg, launched on 25 September 1940 and commissioned on 3 June the following year. The ship was named for the city and allocated the pennant number J9. On 29 June, the destroyer joined the Coastal Fleet, serving on patrols to protect Swedish neutrality and as an escort for convoys travelling through Swedish waters. During 1944, the destroyer was involved in the evacuation of Estonia before the advancing Soviet Army. Gävle rescued 196 refugees during September and October.

Between 1950 and 1951, the destroyer was given a substantial modernisation. The bridge was enlarged and better fire control was fitted, along with a tripod with radar to replace the pole mast. The armament was updated. The central gun was moved aft to a superfiring position, which greatly enhanced the operational capability as the funnels had restricted fire. The anti-aircraft guns were replaced with four single Bofors  guns.

Gävle was rerated a fast frigate on 1 January 1961 along with the rest of the class and the torpedo tubes were replaced by two Squid anti-submarine mortars. The destroyer reentered service in the anti-submarine role with the pennant number F80. During the 1960s, the Swedish Navy decided to retire the larger destroyers and frigates in the fleet as newer missile-equipped fast attack craft became the mainstay of the surface fleet. Gävle was consequently decommissioned on 6 December 1968. The ship was subsequently sold to ASEA and used to provide steam power for the testing phase of the Oskarshamn Nuclear Power Plant, connected to the turbines in the plant and powered them to up 17% overspeed. The frigate was finally broken up in 1972.

References

Citations

Bibliography

 
 
 
 
 
 
 
 
 
 
 
 
 
 

1940 ships
Destroyers of the Swedish Navy
Ships built in Gothenburg
World War II naval ships of Sweden